Baek Eun-bi (Hangul: 백은비, born 14 September 1979) is a retired South Korean female speed skater. She competed at the 1994, 1998 and 2002 edition of Winter Olympics. She qualified for the Olympic 3000 m, in which she placed 23rd. She again qualified for the Olympics in 1998, and again placed 23rd in the 3000 m and 25th in the 1500 m. Her last Olympic again ended up in the lower half of the field (33rd in the 1500m, 25th in the 3000m).

Personal records

References

External links
 Skateresults
 
 Personal record

Living people
1979 births
South Korean female speed skaters
Olympic speed skaters of South Korea
Speed skaters at the 1994 Winter Olympics
Speed skaters at the 1998 Winter Olympics
Speed skaters at the 2002 Winter Olympics
Asian Games medalists in speed skating
Speed skaters at the 1996 Asian Winter Games
Speed skaters at the 1999 Asian Winter Games
Speed skaters at the 2003 Asian Winter Games
Speed skaters at the 2007 Asian Winter Games
Asian Games silver medalists for South Korea
Asian Games bronze medalists for South Korea
Medalists at the 2003 Asian Winter Games
People from Chuncheon
Sportspeople from Gangwon Province, South Korea
20th-century South Korean women
21st-century South Korean women